Swami Ayyappan is an Indian soap opera that launched on Asianet channel.The show was produced under the banner of Merryland Studio. It was one of the top rated serials in Indian television. The first season from the series was directed by Suresh Unnithan .The series was dubbed into Tamil as Swami Ayyapan in Vijay TV and Telugu as Swamiye Saranam Ayyappa on MAA TV.

This series aired 4 seasons: Swami Ayyappan
, Swamy Ayyappan Saranam, Sabarimala Sree Dharmashastha and Sabarimala Swamy Ayyappan. Thirteen years after the original broadcast, the fourth season of the series aired on 14 January 2019, rebooting the first season of the original show with a new cast and more modern graphics. Kaushik Babu returned to the Malayalam miniscreen after a long gap in the reboot.

Synopsis
In response to a slight by Lord Indra, the king of Heaven, the divine seer Durvasa curses Indra so he loses all of his wealth. Seeking to regain his fortune, Indra, with the aid of the other gods and demons churn the ocean of milk and attain the nectar of immortality; the Amrita. The demons, envious of Indra and the gods, steal the Amrita and fight over its ownership amongst themselves. To rid the gods of their troubles, Lord Vishnu incarnates as an enchantress, Mohini who not only steals the Amrita for the devas, but also Lord Shiva's heart.

Even as Indra ascends his throne once again with his regained riches, Mahishasura, the Demon King of the Rakshasa clan attacks Heaven and Dethrones him. To destroy him and bring back the natural order of nature, Brahma, Vishnu and Shiva create Goddess Durga who accomplishes her task successfully. Seeking to avenge her brother, Mahishi, Mahishasura's younger sister seeks a boon from Brahma that renders her immortal. If she dies, it could only be at the hands of Shiva's and Vishnu's son. Confident that the two male gods cannot have a son together, Mahishi wreaks turmoil in Heaven, drowning the gods in gloom once again.

Meanwhile, Bhasmasura, an ambitious demon performs austerities to please Lord Shiva, and is given a boon, according to his own wishes, to reduce whoever he touches to dust. Skeptic of the boon, he wishes to test the boon on Shiva himself. Shiva, who foresaw that Vishnu would help him, feigns panic and allows Bhasmasura to chase him. Vishnu appears as Mohini, the Enchantress, once again and distracts the demon. She challenges him to a dance competition where he had to mirror every move of Mohini. The Enchantress touches her head at the end of the dance, which is copied by Bhasmasura, who is instantly reduced to ash.

Rajashekharan, the king of the princely state of Pandalam, in Kerala is a childless, wise and brave ruler. He and his queen are much loved by their subjects who pray for the childless royal couple to be blessed with a prince who is just as fair and great as his father, if not, more. To rid himself of the morose environment of the palace, the King goes out on a hunt.

After the death of Bhasmasura, Shiva had immersed himself into solidarity. His companion and mount Nandi reveals this to Narada, the travelling, mystical, loud mouth of a sage who asks requests Shiva to open up his heart to him. Shiva admits that he has developed feelings for Mohini and that he doesn't know how to go about asking Vishnu to allow him to see her again. Narad informs Vishnu of Shiva's desire. Vishnu, flattered, transforms into Mohini once again. She visits Shiva. They talk. They dance. and finally, Shiva makes love to her.

Of their union is born a child, the human incarnation of Dharma Sastha, the lord of Righteous Conduct. Shiva and Vishnu, aware of Rajashekharan's miserable state, leave the child in the forest in such a manner that he would be discovered by the king. Before leaving, Mohini ties a bell around the baby's neck. The child cries loudly, and the gods allow the cries to reach the kings ears who searches for the baby all over the forest. He finally finds the child and snuggles him.

Lord Shiva instantly appears in front of the king in the form of a priest and announces that the baby is of divine origins and that he should take care of him as his own. Rajashekaran happily agrees. Before, Shiva says that the boy is to be named "Manikandan" as he has a "Mani" (Malayalam for "Bell") around his Kandam (Malayalam for "neck") as he was discovered in said state by his new father.

Rajashekaran's entire kingdom rejoices the arrival of Manikandan. The king's minister, who was to be anointed as the King of Pandalam if the King passed away without an heir is envious of Manikandan from the moment the king announces that Manikandan will succeed him.

Manikandan grew into a boy well versed in academic lore and martial arts. Meanwhile, the Queen gives birth to another son. The King regards Manikandan as his elder son. The King's corrupt Minister with his deep dislike for Manikandan, makes the innocent Queen believe that ill would befall her if Manikandan is crowned Yuvaraja and that the kingdom actually belongs to her son. They conspire to get rid of Manikandan by hook or crook.

They bribe the royal physician into becoming an accomplice of theirs. The Rani pretends to be afflicted with severe pain in the stomach, and the physician prescribes the milk of a tigress as the only cure. The King knows that none could be deputed for a mission that was so patently suicidal. However, the youthful and valiant Manikandan steps forth and volunteer to fetch the milk. Despite the worried protestations of his foster-father, he sets out for the fearful forests. It is here that Manikandan kills Mahishi.

Days later, Manikandan enters the palace precincts riding a fierce tigress and followed by a pack of its cubs. The schemers get frightened into confessing their nefarious plot. They and others now know that Manikandan is no ordinary being. They are convinced of His divine origins, and pray to him to be with them for their own salvation and for the safety of the kingdom. However, Manikandan is now determined to leave the place.

Filled with happiness, grief, fear, wonder and bhakti and self-surrender, the King prays for the mercy and blessings of Manikandan. He repents he cannot fully visualize the truth of the divine powers of the Lord and repeatedly requests him to forgive him for behaving as if he were only his son. The Lord lovingly embraces the King who continues to pray: " Lord, kindly bless me by freeing me from my egos and the worldly life of birth and rebirth and grant me ' moksha’ (salvation). Kindly continue to be the saviour of my family and stay eternally in my kingdom." Manikandan then enlightened the King on the path of attainment of 'moksha'. These words of the Lord are contained in ‘Bhuthanathageetha'. To the King who is by now mentally cleansed and completely immersed in 'bhakthi', Lord Ayyappa says: "I am to free you from all worldly sorrows & worries and to grant you 'moksha'. All those who are and would be born in your family shall have my blessings unfailingly. I am always accessible to 'bhakthi' and only 'bhakthi." The Lord tells the King that he could construct a temple at Sabarimala, north of the holy river Pampa and install His deity there. Ayyappa also explains how the Sabarimala pilgrimage shall be undertaken, emphasizing the importance of 'vrutham' and what the devotees can attain by His 'darshan'.

The Lord further consoles the King saying that the devotees who held him and his descendants in 'bhakthi' shall happen to be devoted to him as well. Manikandan then blesses the King and all others assembled there, and vanishes soon. The King duly constructs the temple at Sabarimala, dedicated to Him.

Production
Producers Karthikeyan spotted Kaushik Babu in a magazine and he was invited to the studio. After dressing up, everyone was shocked to see the resemblance between Kaushik and the painting of Swami Ayyappan. Thus Kaushik who was a child artist in Telugu film industry signed up to play the lead role marking his Television debut.

Later Devan, Aishwariyaa Bhaskaran, Sukanya, Lakshmi Gopalaswamy, Rajan P. Dev and Nandhu were signed into play the lead roles along with other prominent actors from Malayalam Film and Television industry.

Cast

Season 1 - Swami Ayyappan

Main
 Kaushik Babu as Ayyappan / Manikandan
 Devan as Pandala Rajavu
 Aishwariyaa Bhaskaran  as Mahishi
 Sukanya as Pandalam Maharani
 Rajan P. Dev as Pandalam Mantri
 Nandhu as Chakrapani

Recurring

Rajesh
 Venuji
 Sidhraj
 Sudheer as Dattatreya
 Sarath Das as Murugan
 Sajan Surya as Arjuna
 Poojappura ravi
 Shalu Menon as Parvathi devi
 Sreeja Chandran as Lakshmi Devi / Seetha
 V. K. Sreeraman as Rishi
 Anand Bharathi as Vavaru
 Lavanya as Chakrapani's Sister / Chandika
 Sathyapriya as Lakshmi (Gurumatha)
 Kalasala Babu as Gurumooppan/Malamooppan
 Kanakalatha as Manu's mother
 Kollam Thulasi as Karumadi Kaimal
 Kochu Preman as Namoorishan
 Thilakan as Mahapandithan
 Vimalraj as Vrikrasuran or Bhasmasuran
 Vanchiyoor Praveen kumar as Bhatti Shastri
 Baiju as Kunjulakshmi's father
 Shobi Thilakan as Chandakan
 Kailaasnath as Jyotsyan
 Jagannatha Varma
 Subbalakshmi as Vyttatti muttashi
 Mukundan Menon as Shankaran
 Praveena as Kunju Lakshmi's Mother
 Ramya
 Sreedevi Anil
 Karthika Kannan as Sarama
 Mahalakshmi
 Bindu Murali as Bhasma Devi
 Vishnuprasad
 Fathima Babu  as Unnikrishnan's mother
 Ravi Vallathol as Unnikrishnan's mother
 Saranya Sasi as Vedavthy
 Jagathy Sreekumar as Velappan
 Mahesh as Gurunathan
 T. P. Madhavan
 Keerikkadan Jose
 Irshad
 K. P. A. C. Lalitha as Ratnavathi's mother
 Mohan Ayroor
 Kanya Bharathi
 Yathikumar
 Meena Kumari as Ratnavathi
 Sreekala Sasidharan
 Idavela Babu
 Chandra Lakshman
 Adithyan Jayan
 Anu Joseph
 Priyanka Anoop as Mayamma
 Harsha Nair
 Ibrahimkutty
 Poornima Anand as Saraswathi
 Jayakrishnan
 Yathikumar
 Thirumala Ramachandran
 Gayathri Varsha as Dharmi
 Anju
 Master Sujith as Young Ayyappan
 Master Dhananjay as Young Ayyappan
 Baby Devu Krishnan as Subadra
 Baby Anushri as Kunjulakshmi
 Master Ashwin Thampy as Veluthunni
 Master Rahul as Rajarajan
 Master Venkatesh as young Kannan
 Master Rashid
 Master Ajay as Manu
 Master Sreejit
 Master Sarath kumar as Kannan

Guest
 Lakshmi Gopalaswamy as Mohini
 Saranya Mohan as Malikapurathamma

Season 2 - Swami Ayyappan Saranam

Cast
Kaushik Babu
Devan
Meenakumari
Anu Joseph
Mukundan Menon
Sreelatha Namboothiri
Sreekala Sasidharan
Saranya Sasi
Manka Mahesh
Deepa Jayan
Maya Moushmi
Sukumari
Sharika Menon
Prajusha Gowri
Shalu Menon
Sreeja Chandran
Vishu Prasad
Nandhu
Sidharaj
Master Dhananjay

Season 3 - Sabarimala Sree Dharamashastha

Cast
Kaushik Babu
 Praveena as Devi
 Harsha Nair
 Indulekha S
 K.R.Vijaya
T.S.Raju
 Maya Vishwanath
 Baby Nayana
 Manju Satheesh
 Sonikha
 Maya Moushmi
 Meenakumari

Season 4 - Sabarimala Swami Ayyapan

Cast
Kaushik Babu as Ayyappan
Master Akilesh as Young Ayyappan
Master Madhav M Sunil as Young Ayyappan
Archana Suseelan as Mahishi
Shiju as Panthalam Maharajavu
Boban Alummoodan as Devendran
Latha Rao as Panthalam Maharani
Kala dharan as Shukracharya
Master Leswin as Shankaran
Anu Joseph as Adi Parashakthi, Mahakali, Durga
Ambili Devi /Arathi Ajith as Lakshmi Devi
Sreekala Sasidharan/Sonika as Parvathy Devi
Shamna Kasim as Mohini
Sonikha as Saraswati Devi
Murali Mohan as Guru
Sindhu Jacob as Gurupathni
Sindhu Varma as Damayanthi,Manthri patni
Yousaf Harisree as Chakrapani
Sreekanth as Yama
Akshara Kishore as Malli
Shemi Martin as Malli's mother
Hareendran as Chanthu
Sreekanth as Shani
Sudhir Sukumaran as Udayanan
Sreekala as Kalikutty
Sajan Surya as Harishchandra
Sini Varghese as Chandramati
Kalesh Kalakkodu
Yathikumar as Vashisht
Subhash Menon as Kumaravarman
Kottayam Rasheed as Mahisha maharshi
Naveen Arakkal as Dattan
Sabarinath as Vavar
Aparnnaa Nair
Thirumala Ramachandran as Ramanunni
Arya Sreeram
Hari as Chnadrakant
Kezia Joseph
Anushree (Prakrithi)
Sangeetha Rajendran
Indulekha S as Sumangala
Prajusha as Gouri
Kottayam Rasheed
Leena Nair as Sabari/Malini
Ibrahimkutty
Anuradha Krishnamoorthy
Sreekala
Amboori Jayan
Adithyan  Jayan as Achuthan
Faisal Razi

Songs
Sabarimamala Vazhum Ayyappa (Title song)
Harivarasanam (Closing theme)
Chandrakaladhara (Song of Mohini and Bhasmasura)
Siva-lasya (Song of Mohini and Siva)
Veeravirada (Pandhalam celebration song)
Padhakam Malam Thozhunne Murari (Devotional song)
Mannilum Vinnilum (Song at Gurukulam - Taken from the film Swami Ayyappan)
Harinarayana Jayanarayana (Song sung by Maharshi Naradar - Taken from the film Swami Ayyappan)
Eshwaran Illathoru Idavumilaa (Song at Gurukulam)

Sequel
In 2010, Merryland Studio aired a series titled Swami Ayyappan Saranam which was a continuation to the series which portrays different experiences of Swami Ayyappan. Devan and Kaushik Babu reprised their roles along with Meenakumari and several Malayali artists.

In 2012, the third installment to the series was launched in Asianet titled Sabarimala Shri Dharmashasta which depicts different stories of ayyappa bhaktha's (Devotees of ayyappa). Kaushik Babu made a comeback to Malayalam industry through this serial along with K. R. Vijaya, T. S. Raju, Praveena, Maya Vishwanath, Harsha Nair, Indulekha and Baby Nayana in the lead roles.

In 2019, the fourth installment to the series launched in Asianet titled Sabarimala Swami Ayyappan which is an official remake of season one in a different format. Kaushik Babu is making his relaunch as an adult actor in malayalam industry through this serial.

References 

Indian television series
Asianet (TV channel) original programming
Indian television soap operas
Serial drama television series
2008 Indian television series debuts
Malayalam-language television shows
Indian drama television series
Indian television series about Hindu deities